Sara Elizabeth Lioi (born December 17, 1960) is a United States district judge of the United States District Court for the Northern District of Ohio.

Early life and education
Born in Canton, Ohio, Lioi graduated from Bowling Green State University with her Bachelor of Arts degree in 1983 and later from Ohio State University College of Law with a Juris Doctor in 1987.

Legal career
Following law school graduation, Lioi joined the law firm of Day, Ketterer, Raley, Wright & Rybolt, Ltd. in the fall of 1987 and was promoted to partner in that firm in December 1993. In November 1997, during his second term as governor, George Voinovich appointed Lioi as a judge in the Stark County Court of Common Pleas, Central Division. She was elected to a four-year term in November 1998 and then re-elected for a six-year term in November 2002.

Federal judicial career
On the recommendation of Senators George Voinovich and Mike DeWine, Lioi was nominated to the United States District Court for the Northern District of Ohio by President George W. Bush on January 9, 2007, to a seat vacated by Lesley B. Wells as Wells took senior status. Lioi was confirmed by the Senate on March 8, 2007 and received her commission on March 14, 2007.

Lioi oversaw the prosecution of Jimmy Dimora and others in the Cuyahoga County corruption case, sentencing Dimora to 28 years. The case was affirmed on appeal to the United States Court of Appeals for the Sixth Circuit, and the Supreme Court declined to hear Dimora's further appeal.

References

Sources

1960 births
Living people
Bowling Green State University alumni
Ohio State University Moritz College of Law alumni
Ohio state court judges
Judges of the United States District Court for the Northern District of Ohio
United States district court judges appointed by George W. Bush
21st-century American judges
Lawyers from Canton, Ohio
21st-century American women judges